Child's Play. may refer to:

Film and TV

Film
 Child's Play (franchise), an American slasher horror film series
 Child's Play (1988 film), a supernatural slasher film
 Child's Play (2019 film), a reboot of the 1988 film
 Child's Play (1954 film), a sci-fi film
 Child's Play (1972 film), a film directed by Sidney Lumet with James Mason based on the play
 Child's Play (1992 film), a German film
 Love Me If You Dare (French title Jeux d'enfants i.e. Child's Play), a 2003 French-Belgian film
 Juego de Niños ("Child's Play"), a 1995 Spanish horror film

Television 
 Child's Play (game show), a 1982 game show
 Child's Play (British game show), a British game show based on a U.S. format of the same name
 Child's Play (Australian game show), an Australian game show based on a U.S. show of the same name
 "Child's Play", a 1984 episode of Hammer House of Mystery and Suspense
 "Child's Play", a 1985 episode of Transformers
 "Child's Play", a 1988 episode of Tanner '88 
 "Child's Play", a 1993 episode of In the Heat of the Night
 "Child's Play" (Star Trek: Voyager), a 2000 episode of Star Trek: Voyager
 "Child's Play" (Time Squad), a 2002 episode of Time Squad
 "Child's Play", a 2007 episode of CSI: NY
 "Child's Play", a 2012 episode of Lego Ninjago: Masters of Spinjitzu

Literature
 "Child's Play", a 1947 science fiction short story by William Tenn
 Child's Play (Ichiyo  Higuchi novella), novella by Ichiyō Higuchi 
 Child's Play (play), a 1970 stage play by Robert Marasco
Child’s Play, novel (Dalziel & Pascoe Book 9) by Reginald Hill
Child’s Play, novel by Andrew Neiderman
 Child's Play (Kia Abdullah novel), a 2009 novel by Kia Abdullah
 Child's Play (comics), a Marvel Comics crossover

Music
 Child's Play, children's music review column in Billboard
 Child's Play (band), a hard rock band from Baltimore, Maryland, USA
 "Child's Play", song by When in Rome from When in Rome
 "Childs Play", a song by Drake from Views

Other
 Child's Play (charity), a children's charity
 Child's Play (candy), a brand of candy assortments
 Child's Play (module), an adventure module published in 1989 for the Dungeons & Dragons fantasy role-playing game
 Childs Play (website), a defunct child pornography website captured by law enforcement in 2016 and shut down September 2017
 Children's games